Arnuwanda was the name of the three Hittite emperors:

Arnuwanda I
Arnuwanda II
Arnuwanda III